Paweł Miesiąc (born 24 April 1985 in Poland) is a Polish motorcycle speedway rider has won Team Under 21 World Champion title.

His surname Miesiąc means 'month' in Polish.

Career details

World Championships 
 Individual U-21 World Championship
 2006 - 5th place (8 pts)
 Team Speedway World Championship (U-21 World Cup)
 2006 - U-21 World Champion (3 pts)

European Championships 
 European Club Champions' Cup
 2009 - 4th place (0 pts) for Simon & Wolf Debrecen

Domestic competitions 
 Individual Polish Championship
 2009 - 13th place in Semi-Final 2
 Silver Helmet (U-21)
 2005 - 2nd place

See also 
Poland national speedway team
Stal Rzeszów

External links 
(pl) Official website

1986 births
Living people
Polish speedway riders
Team Speedway Junior World Champions
Place of birth missing (living people)